Chen Ji (born December 5, 1976 in Shanghai) is a female Chinese handball player who competed at the 2004 Summer Olympics.

In 2004, she finished eighth with the Chinese team in the women's competition. She played six matches and scored nine goals.

External links
profile

1976 births
Living people
Handball players at the 2004 Summer Olympics
Olympic handball players of China
Chinese female handball players
Handball players from Shanghai